Bernardo Dovizi of Bibbiena (4 August 1470 – 9 November 1520) was an Italian cardinal and comedy writer, known best as Cardinal Bibbiena, for the town of Bibbiena, where he was born.

Biography

He received a substantial literary training, and became a preceptor and boon companion of Giovanni dei Medici, the future Pope Leo X (from 1513 to his death in 1521). In November 1494, when the Medici were banished, he supported them. Soon afterwards he was rewarded with the protection of Julius II and many honours at the Roman court.  In 1513 his arduous efforts on behalf of his lifelong patron secured the election of Giovanni dei Medici to the pontifical throne.

Leo X repaid such services by naming him a Cardinal in the Consistory of 23 September 1513, and appointing him Cardinal Deacon of S. Maria in Porticu.  Leo continued to show his favor by appointing Bibbiena his treasurer and entrusting him with many important missions, among them the command of the Papal army in the War of Urbino (1517) and a legation to France (1518). Later on, the cardinal's strong sympathies for France lost him Leo's confidence. As cardinal he steadily extended his generous patronage of the arts - he was a close friend of Raphael, whom he had known since his youth, and arranged his engagement to his niece. Raphael painted a number of works for him, including frescoes of a classical and erotic style for his bathroom in the Vatican.

Author

His literary fame is mainly connected with the first comedy of note written in Italian prose, La Calandra (also, known as Il Calandro and La Calandria), was probably given for the first time at Urbino, about 1507. It was performed elaborately at Rome, seven years later, in the presence of Leo X and Isabella Gonzaga d'Este, Marchioness of Mantua. Though containing glaringly immoral scenes, using the plot of Plautus's Menaechmi, it possessed the features of modern comedy and won plaudits for its sparkling wit and fine characterization.

The main character, Calandro or Calandrino, was borrowed from Giovanni Boccaccio's Decameron in which he appears as a character in four stories. The author of the comedy sympathizes with Fulvia, and her lover Lidio, mocking the foolish husband of Calandro, who falls in love with Lidio, who changes into women's dress. The speeches of Fesenio, the servant of Calandro, shine with Italian sparkling jokes.

Ariosto and Machiavelli imitated this comedy in their plays.

A Paduan poet serving at the Dresden Court, Stefano Benedetto Pallavicino, wrote a libretto based on the same story for the comic opera Calandro by Giovanni Alberto Ristori. It was first staged in 1726 at the castle of Pilnitz near Dresden, and in 1731 in Moscow it was the first ever opera performed in Russia.

There were also the operas by:
Antonio Sacchini, L'avaro deluso, o Don Calandrino (24 November 1778 London)
Johann Georg Schürer, Calandro (20 January 1748 Dresden)
Giuseppe Gazzaniga, Il Calandrino (1771 Venice)

See also
 Stufetta del cardinal Bibbiena
Plautus
Menaechmi
Calandro
Stefano Benedetto Pallavicino
Summary of Decameron tales

References

Sources
Barbiche, B.; S. de Dainville Barbiche (1985). "Les lègats "a latere" en France," in: Archivium historiae pontificiae, 22 (1985), pp. 93–165 at p. 50.
Cardella, Lorenzo (1793). Memorie storiche de' cardinali della santa romana.  Tomo quarto (Roma: Pagliarini 1793), pp. 7–9. 

Gaeta, F. (1969.  "Il Bibbiena diplomatico," Rinascimento, serie 2, 9 (1969), pp. 69–94.

Santelli, A. (1931). Il cardinal Bibbiena, Bologna 1931. (panegyric)

External links

Patrizi, Giorgio (1992), "Dovizi, Bernardo, detto il Bibbiena," Dizionario Biografico degli Italiani - Volume 41 (1992)  Retrieved: 2017-01-13.
 
 
 
Catholic Encyclopedia 

1470 births
1520 deaths
People from the Province of Arezzo
Italian dramatists and playwrights
16th-century Italian cardinals
Patrons of literature
Italian male dramatists and playwrights
Captains General of the Church